"Fair Shake" is a song by American country music duo Foster & Lloyd.  It was released in January 1989 as the first single from the album Faster & Llouder.  The song reached #5 on the Billboard Hot Country Singles & Tracks chart.  The song was written by Radney Foster, Bill Lloyd and Guy Clark.

Chart performance

Year-end charts

References

1989 singles
Foster & Lloyd songs
Songs written by Guy Clark
Songs written by Radney Foster
RCA Records singles
Songs written by Bill Lloyd (country musician)
1989 songs